Ngooraialum were an indigenous Australian tribal subgroup, one of 3 comprising the Ngurai-illam Wurrung, though Norman Tindale placed them among the Taungurung. They inhabited land along the Goulburn River in central Victoria, north of Mitchellstown, at Murchison, above Toolamba, within  of the Murray-Goldburn junction. The heart of their land was Noorillim, which they called Waaring.

Language
The Ngooraialum spoke a dialect of Taungurung, a Kulinic language of the Pama-Nyungan language family, as did the Taungurong. Their ethnonym Nguraialum denotes the dialect they spoke.

History
The Ngooraialum were first mentioned in 1840, when they visited the Mitchellstown depot in February of that year. At that time, their ngurungaeta was Weeng-her-bil. They were said to be numerous and in good condition, despite some skin diseases, and the names of 53 were registered in 1845.

They were frequently in conflict with the neighbouring Bangerang, Edward M. Curr, noting that a native from Swan Hill used a word used by the Ngooraialum  to the south-east, but not by the tribe in the intermediate area, developed a whole theory of the migration of all the tribes in Australia.

Today, many Ngooraialum in the Goulburn Valley live in the settlement of Rumbalara built in 1958 to replace a shanty town on the edge of Shepparton.

Alternative names
 Ngooralung-boola/Ngouraylung-bulla
 Ngurailum
 Ooraialum
 Oorilim
 Orilims
 Woo-ril-lum/Woo-rai-lim/Wo-ra-lims/Woralim
 Wor-ile-lum-buluc

Source:

Notes

Citations

Sources

Aboriginal peoples of Victoria (Australia)
History of Victoria (Australia)